AMOS-4 is an Israeli commercial communications satellite, operated by Spacecom Satellite Communications, Tel Aviv-based, part of the AMOS series of satellites.

History 
Spacecom, the AMOS satellites operator, announced in 2007 that it has signed an agreement to build and launch AMOS-4, with Israel Aerospace Industries. IAI constructed the satellite for approximately US$365 million. Spacecom paid US$100 million for AMOS-4. The Israeli government paid Spacecom US$265 million generated from a pre-launch deal to supply it with services on AMOS-4 over the satellite's full 12 year life span. AMOS-4 was originally considered as a candidate for launch on a SpaceX Falcon-9 launch vehicle. The satellite was later assigned to a Zenit-3SLB launch vehicle and was finally launched in August 2013.

Launch 
It lifted off on 31 August 2013, 20:05:00 UTC from Baikonur Cosmodrome, Kazakhstan. The geostationary satellite provides direct-to-home television broadcasting, multimedia, broadband Internet and mobile communications services for 12 years, to communication centers, distribution of internet services and data transmissions to communications networks. AMOS-4 extends Spacecom's coverage footprint to Russia and Asia, along with improving service in the Middle East and Europe with Ku-band and Ka-band transponders. The satellite is positioned in geostationary orbit 35,888 km over the equator at 65° East longitude.

Mission 
AMOS-4 was initially operated from 67.25° East longitude for in-orbit testing. The satellite is positioned at 65° East longitude in geostationary orbit.

See also 

 Spacecom
 List of satellites in geosynchronous orbit

References

External links 
 AMOS-4

Satellite television
AMOS-4
Communications satellites of Israel
Communications satellites in geostationary orbit
Spacecraft launched in 2013
Spacecraft launched by Zenit and Energia rockets
2013 in Israel